Griffin James Frazen (born October 8, 1987) is an American actor, best known for his role as Jimmy Finnerty on the sitcom Grounded for Life.

Frazen was born in Los Angeles, California. He graduated from New York University's Gallatin School of Individualized Study in 2009 and Princeton University's Graduate School of Architecture in 2013.

References

External links

1987 births
American male television actors
Living people
American male child actors
Male actors from Los Angeles
New York University Gallatin School of Individualized Study alumni
Princeton University School of Architecture alumni